Quaranti is a comune (municipality) in the Province of Asti in the Italian region Piedmont, located about  southeast of Turin and about  southeast of Asti.

Quaranti borders the following municipalities: Alice Bel Colle, Castelletto Molina, Fontanile, Mombaruzzo, and Ricaldone.

References

External links
 Official website

Cities and towns in Piedmont